Hannes Wolf (born 15 April 1981) is a German football manager who was most recently the caretaker manager of Bayer Leverkusen.

Career
Born in Bochum, Wolf spent his playing career as a striker in German minor leagues, including a stint with the second team of 1. FC Nürnberg. His career on the sidelines began in 2005 at SG Eintracht Ergste, followed by a tenure as player/coach at ASC 09 Dortmund. In 2009, Wolf was named assistant coach of Borussia Dortmund’s men's reserve team, before joining the coaching staff of the club's youth set-up one year later. He later became the head coach of the reserve team. In the final 15 matches he coached, he had a record of six wins, five draws, and four losses. Under his guidance, Dortmund's under 17 squad won the German national championship in 2014 and 2015. He also led the club's under 19 team to the national title in the 2015–16 season.

On 20 September 2016, Wolf became the head coach of 2. Bundesliga side VfB Stuttgart. His first match was a 1–1 draw against VfL Bochum on 23 September 2016. Stuttgart defeated Greuther Fürth 4–0 on 3 October 2016. The following match against Dynamo Dresden, on 15 October 2016, Stuttgart lost 5–0. He eventually guided VfB to promotion to the Bundesliga as 2. Bundesliga champions.

On 28 January 2018, Wolf was sacked in Stuttgart due to lack of success. He finished with a record of 24 wins, nine draws, and 19 losses.

He was appointed as the head coach of Hamburger SV on 23 October 2018. After failing to take HSV back to the Bundesliga, Wolf was sacked by Hamburg, effectively ending his tenure at the club after the last matchday of 2018–19 2. Bundesliga.

He was appointed as the interim head coach of Bayer Leverkusen on 23 March 2021. He left the post on 30 June.

Managerial statistics

References

External links

1981 births
Living people
German football managers
VfB Stuttgart managers
Hamburger SV managers
2. Bundesliga managers
Sportspeople from Bochum
Association football forwards
Bundesliga managers
Borussia Dortmund II managers
K.R.C. Genk managers
Bayer 04 Leverkusen managers
German footballers
Footballers from North Rhine-Westphalia
1. FC Nürnberg II players
Schwarz-Weiß Essen players
Belgian Pro League managers
Expatriate football managers in Belgium
German expatriate football managers
German expatriate sportspeople in Belgium